Absolute zero is the lowest limit of the thermodynamic temperature scale, a state at which the enthalpy and entropy of a cooled ideal gas reach their minimum value, taken as zero kelvin. The fundamental particles of nature have minimum vibrational motion, retaining only quantum mechanical, zero-point energy-induced particle motion. The theoretical temperature is determined by extrapolating the ideal gas law; by international agreement, absolute zero is taken as −273.15 degrees on the Celsius scale (International System of Units), which equals −459.67 degrees on the Fahrenheit scale (United States customary units or imperial units). The corresponding Kelvin and Rankine temperature scales set their zero points at absolute zero by definition.

It is commonly thought of as the lowest temperature possible, but it is not the lowest enthalpy state possible, because all real substances begin to depart from the ideal gas when cooled as they approach the change of state to liquid, and then to solid; and the sum of the enthalpy of vaporization (gas to liquid) and enthalpy of fusion (liquid to solid) exceeds the ideal gas's change in enthalpy to absolute zero. In the quantum-mechanical description, matter (solid) at absolute zero is in its ground state, the point of lowest internal energy.

The laws of thermodynamics indicate that absolute zero cannot be reached using only thermodynamic means, because the temperature of the substance being cooled approaches the temperature of the cooling agent asymptotically. Even a system at absolute zero, if it could somehow be achieved, would still possess quantum mechanical zero-point energy, the energy of its ground state at absolute zero; the kinetic energy of the ground state cannot be removed. 
 
Scientists and technologists routinely achieve temperatures close to absolute zero, where matter exhibits quantum effects such as Bose–Einstein condensate, superconductivity and superfluidity.

Thermodynamics near absolute zero
At temperatures near , nearly all molecular motion ceases and ΔS = 0 for any adiabatic process, where S is the entropy. In such a circumstance, pure substances can (ideally) form perfect crystals with no structural imperfections as T → 0. Max Planck's strong form of the third law of thermodynamics states the entropy of a perfect crystal vanishes at absolute zero. The original Nernst heat theorem makes the weaker and less controversial claim that the entropy change for any isothermal process approaches zero as T → 0:

The implication is that the entropy of a perfect crystal approaches a constant value. An adiabat is a state with constant entropy, typically represented on a graph as a curve in a manner similar to isotherms and isobars.

The Nernst postulate identifies the isotherm T = 0 as coincident with the adiabat S = 0, although other isotherms and adiabats are distinct. As no two adiabats intersect, no other adiabat can intersect the T = 0 isotherm. Consequently no adiabatic process initiated at nonzero temperature can lead to zero temperature. (≈ Callen, pp. 189–190)

A perfect crystal is one in which the internal lattice structure extends uninterrupted in all directions. The perfect order can be represented by translational symmetry along three (not usually orthogonal) axes. Every lattice element of the structure is in its proper place, whether it is a single atom or a molecular grouping. For substances that exist in two (or more) stable crystalline forms, such as diamond and graphite for carbon, there is a kind of chemical degeneracy. The question remains whether both can have zero entropy at T = 0 even though each is perfectly ordered.

Perfect crystals never occur in practice; imperfections, and even entire amorphous material inclusions, can and do get "frozen in" at low temperatures, so transitions to more stable states do not occur.

Using the Debye model, the specific heat and entropy of a pure crystal are proportional to T 3, while the enthalpy and chemical potential are proportional to T 4. (Guggenheim, p. 111) These quantities drop toward their T = 0 limiting values and approach with zero slopes. For the specific heats at least, the limiting value itself is definitely zero, as borne out by experiments to below 10 K. Even the less detailed Einstein model shows this curious drop in specific heats. In fact, all specific heats vanish at absolute zero, not just those of crystals. Likewise for the coefficient of thermal expansion. Maxwell's relations show that various other quantities also vanish. These phenomena were unanticipated.

Since the relation between changes in Gibbs free energy (G), the enthalpy (H) and the entropy is

thus, as T decreases, ΔG and ΔH approach each other (so long as ΔS is bounded). Experimentally, it is found that all spontaneous processes (including chemical reactions) result in a decrease in G as they proceed toward equilibrium. If ΔS and/or T are small, the condition ΔG < 0 may imply that ΔH < 0, which would indicate an exothermic reaction. However, this is not required; endothermic reactions can proceed spontaneously if the TΔS term is large enough.

Moreover, the slopes of the derivatives of ΔG and ΔH converge and are equal to zero at T = 0. This ensures that ΔG and ΔH are nearly the same over a considerable range of temperatures and justifies the approximate empirical Principle of Thomsen and Berthelot, which states that the equilibrium state to which a system proceeds is the one that evolves the greatest amount of heat, i.e., an actual process is the most exothermic one. (Callen, pp. 186–187)

One model that estimates the properties of an electron gas at absolute zero in metals is the Fermi gas. The electrons, being fermions, must be in different quantum states, which leads the electrons to get very high typical velocities, even at absolute zero. The maximum energy that electrons can have at absolute zero is called the Fermi energy. The Fermi temperature is defined as this maximum energy divided by the Boltzmann constant, and is on the order of 80,000 K for typical electron densities found in metals. For temperatures significantly below the Fermi temperature, the electrons behave in almost the same way as at absolute zero. This explains the failure of the classical equipartition theorem for metals that eluded classical physicists in the late 19th century.

Relation with Bose–Einstein condensate

A Bose–Einstein condensate (BEC) is a state of matter of a dilute gas of weakly interacting bosons confined in an external potential and cooled to temperatures very near absolute zero. Under such conditions, a large fraction of the bosons occupy the lowest quantum state of the external potential, at which point quantum effects become apparent on a macroscopic scale.

This state of matter was first predicted by Satyendra Nath Bose and Albert Einstein in 1924–25. Bose first sent a paper to Einstein on the quantum statistics of light quanta (now called photons). Einstein was impressed, translated the paper from English to German and submitted it for Bose to the Zeitschrift für Physik, which published it. Einstein then extended Bose's ideas to material particles (or matter) in two other papers.

Seventy years later, in 1995, the first gaseous condensate was produced by Eric Cornell and Carl Wieman at the University of Colorado at Boulder NIST-JILA lab, using a gas of rubidium atoms cooled to 170 nanokelvin (nK).

A record cold temperature of 450 ± 80 picokelvin (pK) in a BEC of sodium atoms was achieved in 2003 by researchers at the Massachusetts Institute of Technology (MIT). The associated black-body (peak emittance) wavelength of 6,400 kilometers is roughly the radius of Earth.

Absolute temperature scales
Absolute, or thermodynamic, temperature is conventionally measured in kelvin (Celsius-scaled increments) and in the Rankine scale (Fahrenheit-scaled increments) with increasing rarity. Absolute temperature measurement is uniquely determined by a multiplicative constant which specifies the size of the degree, so the ratios of two absolute temperatures, T2/T1, are the same in all scales. The most transparent definition of this standard comes from the Maxwell–Boltzmann distribution. It can also be found in Fermi–Dirac statistics (for particles of half-integer spin) and Bose–Einstein statistics (for particles of integer spin). All of these define the relative numbers of particles in a system as decreasing exponential functions of energy (at the particle level) over kT, with k representing the Boltzmann constant and T representing the temperature observed at the macroscopic level.

Negative temperatures

Temperatures that are expressed as negative numbers on the familiar Celsius or Fahrenheit scales are simply colder than the zero points of those scales. Certain systems can achieve truly negative temperatures; that is, their thermodynamic temperature (expressed in kelvins) can be of a negative quantity. A system with a truly negative temperature is not colder than absolute zero. Rather, a system with a negative temperature is hotter than any system with a positive temperature, in the sense that if a negative-temperature system and a positive-temperature system come in contact, heat flows from the negative to the positive-temperature system.

Most familiar systems cannot achieve negative temperatures because adding energy always increases their entropy. However, some systems have a maximum amount of energy that they can hold, and as they approach that maximum energy their entropy actually begins to decrease. Because temperature is defined by the relationship between energy and entropy, such a system's temperature becomes negative, even though energy is being added. As a result, the Boltzmann factor for states of systems at negative temperature increases rather than decreases with increasing state energy. Therefore, no complete system, i.e. including the electromagnetic modes, can have negative temperatures, since there is no highest energy state, so that the sum of the probabilities of the states would diverge for negative temperatures. However, for quasi-equilibrium systems (e.g. spins out of equilibrium with the electromagnetic field) this argument does not apply, and negative effective temperatures are attainable.

On 3 January 2013, physicists announced that for the first time they had created a quantum gas made up of potassium atoms with a negative temperature in motional degrees of freedom.

History

One of the first to discuss the possibility of an absolute minimal temperature was Robert Boyle. His 1665 New Experiments and Observations touching Cold, articulated the dispute known as the primum frigidum. The concept was well known among naturalists of the time. Some contended an absolute minimum temperature occurred within earth (as one of the four classical elements), others within water, others air, and some more recently within nitre. But all of them seemed to agree that, "There is some body or other that is of its own nature supremely cold and by participation of which all other bodies obtain that quality."

Limit to the "degree of cold"
The question whether there is a limit to the degree of coldness possible, and, if so, where the zero must be placed, was first addressed by the French physicist Guillaume Amontons in 1702, in connection with his improvements in the air thermometer. His instrument indicated temperatures by the height at which a certain mass of air sustained a column of mercury—the volume, or "spring" of the air varying with temperature. Amontons therefore argued that the zero of his thermometer would be that temperature at which the spring of the air was reduced to nothing. He used a scale that marked the boiling point of water at +73 and the melting point of ice at +, so that the zero was equivalent to about −240 on the Celsius scale. Amontons held that the absolute zero cannot be reached, so never attempted to compute it explicitly.
The value of −240 °C, or "431 divisions [in Fahrenheit's thermometer] below the cold of freezing water" was published by George Martine in 1740.

This close approximation to the modern value of −273.15 °C for the zero of the air thermometer was further improved upon in 1779 by Johann Heinrich Lambert, who observed that  might be regarded as absolute cold.

Values of this order for the absolute zero were not, however, universally accepted about this period. Pierre-Simon Laplace and Antoine Lavoisier, in their 1780 treatise on heat, arrived at values ranging from 1,500 to 3,000 below the freezing point of water, and thought that in any case it must be at least 600 below. John Dalton in his Chemical Philosophy gave ten calculations of this value, and finally adopted −3,000 °C as the natural zero of temperature.

Charles's law
From 1787 to 1802, it was determined by Jacques Charles (unpublished), John Dalton, and Joseph Louis Gay-Lussac that, at constant pressure, ideal gases expanded or contracted their volume linearly (Charles's law) by about 1/273 parts per degree Celsius of temperature's change up or down, between 0° and 100° C. This suggested that the volume of a gas cooled at about −273 °C would reach zero.

Lord Kelvin's work
After James Prescott Joule had determined the mechanical equivalent of heat, Lord Kelvin approached the question from an entirely different point of view, and in 1848 devised a scale of absolute temperature that was independent of the properties of any particular substance and was based on Carnot's theory of the Motive Power of Heat and data published by Henri Victor Regnault. It followed from the principles on which this scale was constructed that its zero was placed at −273 °C, at almost precisely the same point as the zero of the air thermometer, where the air volume would reach "nothing".

The race to absolute zero

With a better theoretical understanding of absolute zero, scientists were eager to reach this temperature in the lab. By 1845, Michael Faraday had managed to liquefy most gases then known to exist, and reached a new record for lowest temperatures by reaching . Faraday believed that certain gases, such as oxygen, nitrogen, and hydrogen, were permanent gases and could not be liquefied. Decades later, in 1873 Dutch theoretical scientist Johannes Diderik van der Waals demonstrated that these gases could be liquefied, but only under conditions of very high pressure and very low temperatures. In 1877, Louis Paul Cailletet in France and Raoul Pictet in Switzerland succeeded in producing the first droplets of liquid air . This was followed in 1883 by the production of liquid oxygen  by the Polish professors Zygmunt Wróblewski and Karol Olszewski.

Scottish chemist and physicist James Dewar and Dutch physicist Heike Kamerlingh Onnes took on the challenge to liquefy the remaining gases, hydrogen and helium. However, Kamerlingh Onnes, his rival, was the first to liquefy helium, in 1908, using several precooling stages and the Hampson–Linde cycle. He lowered the temperature to the boiling point of helium . By reducing the pressure of the liquid helium he achieved an even lower temperature, near 1.5 K. These were the coldest temperatures achieved on Earth at the time and his achievement earned him the Nobel Prize in 1913. Kamerlingh Onnes would continue to study the properties of materials at temperatures near absolute zero, describing superconductivity and superfluids for the first time.

Very low temperatures

Standard models of the future expansion of the universe predict that the average temperature of the universe is decreasing over time. This temperature is calculated as the mean density of energy in space; it should not be confused with the mean electron temperature (total energy divided by particle count) which has increased over time.

Absolute zero cannot be achieved, although it is possible to reach temperatures close to it through the use of evaporative cooling, cryocoolers, dilution refrigerators, and nuclear adiabatic demagnetization. The use of laser cooling has produced temperatures of less than a billionth of a kelvin. At very low temperatures in the vicinity of absolute zero, matter exhibits many unusual properties, including superconductivity, superfluidity, and Bose–Einstein condensation. To study such phenomena, scientists have worked to obtain even lower temperatures.
 In November 2000, nuclear spin temperatures below 100 pK were reported for an experiment at the Helsinki University of Technology's Low Temperature Lab in Espoo, Finland. However, this was the temperature of one particular degree of freedom—a quantum property called nuclear spin—not the overall average thermodynamic temperature for all possible degrees in freedom.
This has cooled it down to approximately 1 K, as deduced by astronomical observation, which is the lowest natural temperature ever recorded.
 In November 2003, 90377 Sedna was discovered and is one of the coldest known objects in the Solar System. With an average surface temperature of -400°F (-240°C), due to its extremely far orbit of 903 astronomical units.
 In May 2005, the European Space Agency proposed research in space to achieve femtokelvin temperatures.
 In May 2006, the Institute of Quantum Optics at the University of Hannover gave details of technologies and benefits of femtokelvin research in space.
 In January 2013, physicist Ulrich Schneider of the University of Munich in Germany reported to have achieved temperatures formally below absolute zero ("negative temperature") in gases. The gas is artificially forced out of equilibrium into a high potential energy state, which is, however, cold. When it then emits radiation it approaches the equilibrium, and can continue emitting despite reaching formal absolute zero; thus, the temperature is formally negative.
 In June 2015, experimental physicists at MIT cooled molecules in a gas of sodium potassium to a temperature of 500 nanokelvin, and it is expected to exhibit an exotic state of matter by cooling these molecules somewhat further.
 In 2017, Cold Atom Laboratory (CAL), an experimental instrument was developed for launch to the International Space Station (ISS) in 2018. The instrument has created extremely cold conditions in the microgravity environment of the ISS leading to the formation of Bose–Einstein condensates. In this space-based laboratory, temperatures as low as 1 picokelvin (10−12 K) temperatures are projected to be achievable, and it could further the exploration of unknown quantum mechanical phenomena and test some of the most fundamental laws of physics.
 The current world record for effective temperatures was set in 2021 at 38 picokelvin (pK), or 0.000000000038 of a kelvin, through matter-wave lensing of rubidium Bose–Einstein condensates.

See also

 Kelvin (unit of temperature)
 Charles's law
 Heat
 International Temperature Scale of 1990
 Orders of magnitude (temperature)
 Thermodynamic temperature
 Triple point
 Ultracold atom
 Kinetic energy
 Entropy
 Planck temperature and Hagedorn temperature, hypothetical upper limits to the thermodynamic temperature scale

References

Further reading
 
 
 
 
 BIPM Mise en pratique - Kelvin - Appendix 2 - SI Brochure

External links
 "Absolute zero": a two part NOVA episode originally aired January 2008
 "What is absolute zero?" Lansing State Journal

Cold
Cryogenics
Temperature